Lemuel Williams is an American former Negro league pitcher who played in the 1930s.

Williams played for the Chicago American Giants in 1939. In four recorded appearances on the mound, he posted a 4.30 ERA over 14.2 innings.

References

External links
 and Seamheads

Year of birth missing
Place of birth missing
Chicago American Giants players
Baseball pitchers